The First Responder Network Authority (FirstNet) of the United States was created under the Middle Class Tax Relief and Job Creation Act of 2012 (MCTRJCA) as an independent authority within the National Telecommunications and Information Administration (NTIA). The purpose of FirstNet is to establish, operate, and maintain an interoperable public safety broadband network. To fulfill these objectives, Congress allotted $7 billion and 20 MHz of radio spectrum to build the network.

Background 
The First Responder Network Authority Board of Directors is a team of 15 experts. The FirstNet Board was established as part of the Middle Class Tax Relief and Job Creation Act of 2012. Representatives include the Secretary of Homeland Security, the Attorney General, and the Director of the Office of Management and Budget as permanent members. The remaining members are selected by the Secretary of Commerce and have public safety, technical, network, and/or financial expertise.  Prior to FirstNet, the Public Safety Spectrum Trust was selected by the Federal Communications Commission (FCC) as the Public Safety Broadband Licensee (PSBL) for the 10 MHz of 700 MHz public safety nationwide broadband spectrum.

In March 2023, Joseph Wassel a previous Department of Defence executive who founded global working group on public safety communications has been named as the new CEO of FirstNet.

Radio Access Network (RAN) 
The construction of the nationwide FirstNet network requires each state to have a Radio Access Network (RAN) that will connect to FirstNet's network core. According to the MCTRJCA, FirstNet is responsible for consulting with states, local communities, and tribal governments to develop the requirements for its RAN deployment plan. These efforts began in May 2013. However, each state will have the option to either allow FirstNet to create the RAN or to "opt out" and create its own RAN. Even if a state chooses to opt out and receives approval from the Federal Communications Commission (FCC) to develop its own RAN, the RAN must use the FirstNet network core and must meet FirstNet requirements. For a state to receive FCC approval, it must demonstrate the following abilities:

 Provide the technical capability to operate and fund the RAN
 Maintain ongoing interoperability with the FirstNet Network
 Complete the project within specified comparable timelines
 Execute the plan cost effectively
 Deliver security, coverage, and quality of service comparable to the FirstNet network

States that meet these criteria and receive FCC approval may apply for grant funding through the NTIA.

Broadband wireless network 

Calls for the nationwide broadband system came after September 11, 2001. The federal government has been working toward a system ever since that time. The 9/11 attacks "highlighted the inability for deployed public safety networks to handle a true crisis situation."

FirstNet is in the early stages of creating the first nationwide high-speed broadband wireless network "providing a single interoperable platform for law enforcement, firefighters, paramedics and other public safety officials in every state, county, locality and tribal area.” In an April 2016 article, a spokesman for FirstNet said “FirstNet is going to really revolutionize the communications technology for first responders. Our next-generation technology isn’t just going to save lives, but it’s going to keep our first responders safer and make our communities safer, because it’s going to provide extra situational awareness for people out in the field.”

Currently, there are around 10,000 different and incompatible “land mobile radio networks" that first responders in the U.S. use in their jobs. This patchwork of different systems can get in the way of first responders' being able to effectively communicate with each other during emergencies.

States are able to opt out of FirstNet's new nationwide broadband network. FirstNet assists those states by providing a guide that helps the states deploy communications networks that have interoperability with other systems.

The Federal Communications Commission and the National Telecommunications and Information Administration are also involved in coordinating the broadband system.

At a U.S. Senate hearing in July 2016, Senators Brian Schatz (D-Hawaii) and Roger Wicker (R-Mississippi) expressed concern to FirstNet's CEO, who was testifying at the hearing, about various issues related to the national broadband system. Schatz said that he would rather see FirstNet partner with states instead of "establishing a 'grantee-grantor relationship'". Wicker said he was concerned that the $7 billion budget for the program was not enough funding.

Public forums 
In August 2016 FirstNet held a border security forum in Phoenix, Arizona. FirstNet officials met with federal and local security officials to discuss problems with communications networks and updates on FirstNet's deployment of the national broadband wireless network. FirstNet's representatives said that LTE technology (the data and apps that people have on their smart phones) will help emergency responders during public emergencies.

Implementation 
FirstNet is headquartered in Reston, Virginia, with technical headquarters in Boulder, Colorado. The authority board created a public-private partnership with AT&T in March 2017 to build out FirstNet.

In December, 2017, all 50 states opted in to the network plan with AT&T, but questions remained about when it would be deployed and how cost-effective it is.

Criticism
FirstNet was characterized  as "the most wasteful post-9/11 initiative" by the journalist Steven Brill.

References

External links

TETRA European System

Emergency services in the United States
Interoperable communications
Public safety communications